Barbara Stamm (29 October 1944 – 5 October 2022) was a German politician of the Christian Social Union in Bavaria. She joined the CSU in 1969, was a member of the town council of Würzburg from 1972, and a member of the Landtag of Bavaria from 1976. She was vice-chair of the CSU from 1993 to 2017, and President of the Landtag from 2008 to 2018, the first woman in the position. She was regarded as the most popular Bavarian politician and as her party's "social conscience".

Life and career 
Barbara Stocker was born in Bad Mergentheim on 29 October 1944 to a deaf mother. She grew up with foster parents until age eight, when her mother came to take her home. She had an alcoholic stepfather, who hit her. At times she recovered in a Kinderheim. 

In the 1960s, she trained to be a kindergarten teacher, made possible by a loan from her religion teacher. She worked as Erzieherin and in the care of young people (Jugendarbeit) of the Diocese of Würzburg. She met her future husband at the time, who encouraged her to turn to politics.

Political career 
Stamm joined the Christian Social Union (CSU) in 1969. She was a member of the town council of Würzburg from 1972 to 1987.  She was a member of the Bavarian parliament from 1976 to 2018. She served as deputy chairwoman of the CSU from 1993 until 2017. She was from 1990 Bavaria's commissioner in Romania.

From 1994 until 2001, Stamm was Bavarian State Minister for Health in the government of Minister-President Edmund Stoiber. From 1994 to 2001 she also was Deputy Minister-President of Bavaria. From 2008 to 2018 she served as President of the Landtag of Bavaria. She was a candidate again in 2018, but due to her party's low result was not elected again.

Stamm served as a CSU delegate to the Federal Convention for the purpose of electing the President of Germany in 2004, 2009, 2010, 2012, and 2017. In the negotiations to form a coalition government following the 2013 federal elections, she was part of the 15-member leadership circle chaired by Angela Merkel, Horst Seehofer and Sigmar Gabriel.

Personal life 
Stamm and her husband, Ludwig Stamm, had three children. One, Claudia Stamm (born 1970), was a member of the Bavarian Landtag, from 2009 until 2017 for the Alliance 90/The Greens, then until 2018 without party association. 

Barbara Stamm was diagnosed with breast cancer in 2008, and again in 2018.

Stamm died in Würzburg on 5 October 2022 at age 77.

Other activities 
 , president from 2001
 Bayerischer Rundfunk (BR), president of the Board of Directors (Verwaltungsrat) from 2008 to 2013

 University of Würzburg, member of the Board of Trustees, from 2019 honorary senators
 Technical University of Munich (TUM), member of the Board of Trustees (Hochschulrat) from 2015
 Gegen Vergessen – Für Demokratie, member of the Advisory Board

Awards 
Stamm received the Bavarian Order of Merit in 1987, and the Order of Merit of the Federal Republic of Germany in 1990. She was awarded the Bayerische Verfassungsmedaille in silver and gold in 1999. In 2000, she became an officer of the Order of the Star of Romania.

In 2019, Stamm was honoured by the papal Order of St Gregory the Great. Bishop Franz Jung called her "an outstanding political personality who has always been known as a Christian and as a Catholic, even when she was criticized for it by dissenters" ("herausragende Politiker persönlichkeit, die sich stets als Christin, als Katholikin bekannt hat – auch dann, wenn sie von Andersdenkenden dafür kritisiert wurde"). The same year, she was named an honorary senator of the University of Würzburg.

References

External links 

 Ehemalige Landtagspräsidentin Barbara Stamm gestorben (in German) Stern 5 October 2022
 Trauer um Barbara Stamm: "Langjährige Förderin der Universitätsmedizin Würzburg" (in German) ukw.de 5 October 2022
 "Soziales Gewissen der CSU" – Barbara Stamm mit 77 Jahren verstorben (in German tvmainfranken.de 5 October 2022
 Barbara Stamm erhält Ehrenbürgerwürde der Stadt Würzburg (in German) Würzburg 31 March 2019

1944 births
2022 deaths
Presidents of the Landtag of Bavaria
Members of the Landtag of Bavaria
Ministers of the Bavaria State Government
Women members of State Parliaments in Germany
People from the Free People's State of Württemberg
Christian Social Union in Bavaria politicians
20th-century German women politicians
21st-century German women politicians
Dames of St. Gregory the Great
Recipients of the Cross of the Order of Merit of the Federal Republic of Germany
Commanders of the Order of the Star of Romania
German Roman Catholics
People from Bad Mergentheim